Megalorhipida leucodactyla is a species of moth of the family Pterophoridae that has a pantropical distribution. 

The larvae have been recorded on a wide range of plants, including Boerhavia diffusa, Okenia hypogaea, Acacia neovernicosa, Amaranthus, Mimosa tenuiflora and Commicarpus tuberosus.

References

External links
Review of the Pterophoridae (Lepidoptera) from the Philippines

Oxyptilini
Moths of Australia
Moths described in 1793
Moths of Africa
Moths of Cape Verde
Moths of Asia
Moths of Madagascar
Moths of Mauritius
Moths of the Middle East
Moths of Réunion
Moths of Seychelles
Pantropical fauna